Laurent Capelluto (born 16 March 1971) is a Belgian actor. He has appeared in more than thirty films since 1999.

Filmography

External links 
 

Living people
Belgian male actors
Magritte Award winners
Belgian male film actors
Belgian male television actors
21st-century Belgian male actors
1971 births
Belgian people of Italian descent